Claudio Yafuso (born 21 January 1970) is an Argentine judoka. He competed in the men's half-lightweight event at the 1988 Summer Olympics.

References

1970 births
Living people
Argentine male judoka
Olympic judoka of Argentina
Judoka at the 1988 Summer Olympics
Place of birth missing (living people)